Sclerolaena calcarata, the redburr, is a species of flowering plant in the family Amaranthaceae, native to central and eastern Australia. A perennial rounded subshrub reaching , it is typically found growing in heavy soils.

References

calcarata
Endemic flora of Australia
Flora of the Northern Territory
Flora of South Australia
Flora of Queensland
Flora of New South Wales
Plants described in 1978